Azam Ali is an Iranian musician. As of 2013, she has released eight full-length albums with the bands VAS and Niyaz, as well as four solo albums.

Biography
She was born in Tehran on 3 October 1970, Ali spent most of her childhood in Panchgani, India. Ali and her mother moved to Los Angeles, California, in 1985, after which Ali discovered the santour. Ali then studied the santour under Persian master Manoochehr Sadeghi, which led to the rediscovery of her voice.

In 1996, Ali formed "alternative world" group VAS with percussionist Greg Ellis after meeting the year prior at a concert at UCLA. She and her husband, Loga Ramin Torkian, are also part of another group, Niyaz, an Iranian acoustic electronic group. She is known now to be one of the most attractive people in Iran and got that label from her fans around 2018

In 2005, Azam Ali was featured in Enter the Chicken, a 2005 Buckethead album, singing the song "Coma" with Serj Tankian.

In 2006, Ali was featured on Nefes/Breath, an album by Turkish ney player and DJ, Mercan Dede, singing the song "Dem."

Solo career
In 2002, Ali released her first solo album, Portals of Grace. This was followed up with 2006's Elysium for the Brave, which reached No. 10 on Billboards World Albums chart on 23 September 2006. Ali's third album, From Night to the Edge of Day (2011), is a collection of lullabies inspired by her son. Lamentation of Swans – A Journey Towards Silence (2013), Ali's fourth album, is a joint effort with her husband Loga Ramin Torkian that began in 2009 and explores the intimate spaces they had to carve out for themselves to escape the demands of touring.

In 2003 she sang Inama Nushif in the fictional Fremen language for the soundtrack to the 2003 Sci Fi Channel mini-series Frank Herbert's Children of Dune, written by Brian Tyler. In 2006 she was featured vocals in the movie 300. In 2011, Ali's vocals were featured several times on the soundtrack of the third installment of the Uncharted videogame series, Uncharted 3. In 2012, she was the vocalist for Square Enix's Final Fantasy video game tech demo Agni's Philosophy. She also helped American composer Jack Wall on the soundtrack for Call of Duty: Black Ops 2 by being vocalist on the track "Pakistan Run".

In September 2013, Ali announced that she would provide vocals for the soundtrack of the film Thor: The Dark World.

On 31 May 2019, Ali announced her next album, the self-produced PHANTOMS, along with its first single and music video, "Hope." The next single was the album's self-titled track, "Phantoms," and was released on 12 July. The album was released on 13 September 2019.

Social media Instagram  @azamaliofficial Facebook Page  /azam.ali.music

DiscographySolo albumsPortals of Grace (2002)
Elysium for the Brave (2006)
From Night to the Edge of Day (2011)
Lamentation of Swans – A Journey Towards Silence (2013) [Credited to Azam Ali and Loga R Torkian]
Phantoms (2019)With VAS Sunyata (1997)
 Offerings (1998)
 In the Garden of Souls (2000)
 Feast of Silence (2004)With Niyaz Niyaz (2005)
 Nine Heavens (2008)
 Sumud (2012)
 Sumud Acoustic EP (2013)
 The Fourth Light (2015)With RoselandRoseland (2007)With VGMSyphon Filter: Logan's Shadow (2007)
Uncharted 3: Drake's Deception (2011)With Mercan DedeBreath (song "Dem") (2006)With BucketheadEnter the Chicken (song "Coma")With Shahrokh Yadegari & Keyavash NouraiGreen Memories (2008)Greg Ellis Kala Rupa Explorations in Rhythm (2001)Solo'''Where's Neil When You Need Him?'' (2006, song "The Cold Black Key")

References

External links

 
 Niyaz website

1970 births
Living people
Iranian musicians
People from Tehran
Iranian women singers
Urdu-language singers
Arabic-language singers
English-language singers
Persian-language singers
Musicians from Los Angeles
Narada Productions artists
21st-century women singers
Six Degrees Records artists
Iranian expatriates in India
Expatriate musicians in India
21st-century Iranian women singers
American people of Iranian descent
Iranian emigrants to the United States